The Grimalkin is the second studio album by German progressive metal band Noekk, released on May 19, 2006. It was recorded and mixed at Studio E in September and October 2005 by Markus Stock. All the songs and lyrics are by Noekk.

Track listing 

 The Albatross - 11:00
 The Grimalkin - 10:09
 Codex Deserta - 20:23

Credits 

 F. Baldachini: voice, keys, guitar
 F.F. Yuggoth: drums, bass, guitar

References 

 Noekk: The Grimalkin cd-booklet
 The Grimalkin @ Encyclopaedia Metallum
 The Grimalkin @ Prophecy Productions official website

2006 albums
Noekk albums